"Das ist der Tag, den Gott gemacht" (This is the day that God made) is a German Christian hymn for Easter. In the Catholic hymnal Gotteslob it appears as Gl 329.

History 

The text was written by Heinrich Bone (1813–1893), a pedagogue who is known for his hymnal Cantate! of 1847. When his song was included in the Gotteslob of 1975, Friedrich Dörr (1908–1993) added two stanzas from 1972 to the original three stanzas.

The melody is attributed to Johannes Leisentritt (1527–1586) who is known for his 1567 hymnal Geistliche Lieder und Psalmen der Alten Apostolischer recht und warglaubiger Christlicher Kirchen, one of the hymnals of the counter reformation.

Literature 
 Ludger Stühlmeyer: Christus gestern, heute und in Ewigkeit. Das Lied: Das ist der Tag den Gott gemacht. In: Heinrichsblatt, Osterspezial, No. 15, Bamberg 8  April 2012, p VI.

References 

19th-century hymns in German
Easter hymns
1845 songs